The Hon. Sir Evan Edward Charteris (29 January 1864 – 16 November 1940, Jesmond Hill, Pangbourne) was an English biographer, barrister and arts administrator. He published notable biographies of his friend John Singer Sargent and of Edmund Gosse.

Life
Evan Edward Charteris was the youngest child of Francis Charteris, 10th Earl of Wemyss and Lady Anne Frederica Anson, second daughter of Thomas Anson, 1st Earl of Lichfield. Educated at Eton, he was gazetted to a commission in the Coldstream Guards before spending 1887–88 at Balliol College, Oxford. Called to the Bar from the Inner Temple in 1891, he practiced at the Parliamentary Bar. In 1886, he was one of the founders of the Queen's Club in London.

From 1914 to 1918 he rejoined the Army as a Staff captain. He was made King's Counsel in 1919.

He became chairman of the Trustees of the National Portrait Gallery in 1928, and chairman of the Tate Gallery Board in 1934. He was also a Trustee of the National Gallery and the Wallace Collection. He was knighted in 1932, and in 1938 elected a member of the Athenaeum.<ref name=Nature>Announcements, Nature 141 (19 March 1938), p. 509</ref>

On 9 August 1930 he married Lady Dorothy Margaret Browne, the elder daughter of Valentine Browne, 5th Earl of Kenmare and Hon. Elizabeth Baring, and the widow of Lord Edward Grosvenor.

Works
(ed.) A short account of the affairs of Scotland: in the years 1744, 1745, 1746William Augustus, duke of Cumberland, his early life and times (1721-1748), 1913William Augustus, duke of Cumberland and the seven years' war, 1925John Sargent: with reproductions from his paintings and drawings, 1927The Life and Letters of Sir Edmund Gosse'', London, 1931

References

External links

1864 births
1940 deaths
Alumni of Balliol College, Oxford
British Army personnel of World War I
British arts administrators
Coldstream Guards soldiers
English biographers
Historians of Scotland
Members of the Inner Temple
People associated with the National Gallery, London
People associated with the Tate galleries
People associated with the Wallace Collection
People educated at Eton College
20th-century King's Counsel
Trustees of the National Portrait Gallery
Younger sons of earls
English barristers